The Central District of Qaem Shahr County is a district (bakhsh) in Qaem Shahr County, Mazandaran Province, Iran. At the 2006 census, its population was 275,807, in 74,907 families.  The District has two cities: Qaem Shahr & Arateh. The District has five rural districts (dehestan): Aliabad Rural District, Balatajan Rural District, Bisheh Sar Rural District, Kuhsaran Rural District, and Nowkand Kola Rural District.

References 

Qaem Shahr County
Districts of Mazandaran Province